Slave Master may refer to:

Slave Master, a band that released the 1993 album Under the 6
"Slave Master", a song by Gregory Isaacs from the 1979 soundtrack Rockers
"Slave Master", a song by Future from the 2015 album DS2